In physics, the Toda oscillator is a special kind of nonlinear oscillator. It represents a chain of particles with exponential potential interaction between neighbors.  These concepts are named after Morikazu Toda.  The Toda oscillator is used as a simple model to understand the phenomenon of self-pulsation, which is a quasi-periodic pulsation of the output intensity of a solid-state laser in the transient regime.

Definition 
The Toda oscillator is a dynamical system of any origin, which can be described with dependent coordinate  and independent coordinate , characterized in that the evolution along independent coordinate  can be approximated with equation
 

where 
,  and prime denotes the derivative.

Physical meaning 
The independent coordinate  has sense of time. Indeed, it may be proportional to time  with some relation like , where  is constant.

The derivative  may have sense of velocity of particle with coordinate ; then  can be interpreted as acceleration; and the mass of such a particle is equal to unity.

The dissipative function  may have sense of coefficient of the speed-proportional friction.
 

The potential  is a fixed function, which also shows exponential growth at large positive values of coordinate .

In the application in laser physics,  may have a sense of logarithm of number of photons in the laser cavity, related to its steady-state value.

Both analogies, with a unity mass particle and logarithm of number of photons, are useful in the analysis of behavior of the Toda oscillator.

Energy
In this case, we can speak about the period of pulsation, since the function  is almost periodic.

where

however, other solutions may be obtained using the principle of translational invariance.

The ratio  is a convenient parameter to characterize the amplitude of pulsation.  Using this, we can express the median value

as
;
and the energy

In application, the quantity  need not be the physical energy of the system; in these cases, this dimensionless quantity may be called quasienergy.

Period of pulsation
The period of pulsation is an increasing function of the amplitude .

When , 
the period 

When , the period 

In the whole range
, the period  and frequency  can be approximated by

 
 

to at least 8 significant figures.  The relative error of this approximation does not exceed .

Decay of pulsation
In the first approximation, the parameters  and  give additive contributions to the decay; the decay rate, as well as the amplitude and phase of the nonlinear oscillation, can be approximated with elementary functions in a manner similar to the period above. In describing the behavior of the idealized Toda oscillator, the error of such approximations is smaller than the differences between the ideal and its experimental realization as a self-pulsing laser at the optical bench. However, a self-pulsing laser shows qualitatively very similar behavior.

Continuous limit
The Toda chain equations of motion, in the continuous limit in which the distance between neighbors goes to zero, become the Korteweg–de Vries equation (KdV) equation. Here the index labeling the particle in the chain becomes the new spatial coordinate.

In contrast, the Toda field theory is achieved by introducing a new spatial coordinate which is independent of the chain index label. This is done in a relativistically invariant way, so that time and space are treated on equal grounds. This means that the Toda field theory is not a continuous limit of the Toda chain.

References 

Mathematical physics
Atomic, molecular, and optical physics